The 1974 Omloop Het Volk was the 29th edition of the Omloop Het Volk cycle race and was held on 2 March 1974. The race started and finished in Ghent. The race was won by Joseph Bruyère.

General classification

References

1974
Omloop Het Nieuwsblad
Omloop Het Nieuwsblad